The 2020–21 Huddersfield Town Football Club season was the club's 112th season in existence and second consecutive season in the EFL Championship. Huddersfield Town also competed in the FA Cup and the EFL Cup. The season covers the period from 23 July 2020 to 30 June 2021.

Squad at the end of the season

Transfers

Transfers in

Loans in

Loans out

Transfers out

Pre-season and friendlies

Competitions

Overview

EFL Championship

League table

Results summary

Results by matchday

Matches
The 2020–21 season fixtures were released on 21 August.

FA Cup

The third round draw was made by Robbie Savage on 30 November, with Premier League and EFL Championship all entering the competition.

EFL Cup

The first round draw was made on 18 August, live on Sky Sports, by Paul Merson.

Squad statistics

Awards

Huddersfield Town Blue & White Foundation Player of the Month Award
Awarded monthly to the player that was chosen by members of the Blue & White Foundation voting on htafc.com

References

External links

Huddersfield Town A.F.C. seasons
Huddersfield Town A.F.C.